The Blue line (officially Metro 3, but called Tub 3 ("Tube 3", or abbreviation for "Tunnelbana 3") internally) is one of the three Stockholm metro lines.

History 
At that time line 10 was diverted over this section, and no more passenger trains operated on the Hallonbergen–Rinkeby section. Since then the section has only been used for access to the depot in Rissne.

The primary reason for constructing the line was the need for public transport to the large residential areas in the northwestern part of Stockholm, built during the period 1965–1975. Several of these areas, however, were without rapid transit during the first years because the opening of the metro was delayed until 1975. During those years Tensta and Rinkeby were served by feeder buses from Spånga station.

The blue line was more costly to build than the previous lines because the general requirements for building design increased over the years.

Opening dates

Future plans

Nacka and Gullmarsplan 
When the blue line was designed during the boom years of the 1960s, there were also plans to build an extension from Kungsträdgården to Nacka, but they  were not realized. However, in 2013, it was decided that the line will run from Kungsträdgården to Nacka centrum via Sofia, Hammarby canal, Sickla and Järla. Construction was expected to have started in 2019 and completed seven to eight years later.

Construction started in 2019, and service is expected to begin in 2030.

Akalla to Barkarby 
An extension beyond Akalla was approved for line 11. An intermediate station will serve the new Barkarbystaden residential area, and the line will terminate at the Stockholm commuter rail Barkarby station, allowing revisions to the commuter service. Official groundbreaking took place in September 2018, with completion now scheduled for 2026.

Route 
At , the Blue line is the shortest of the Stockholm metro; however, the entire line is north of the Mälaren. Line 10 runs between Kungsträdgården and Hjulsta and includes 14 stations. Six of the stations are served by both lines. The blue line carries an average of about 204,700 passengers per day (2019), or 55 million per year (2005).

Stations 
In total, the Blue line has 20 stations, of which 19 are underground and one is on the surface. (However, metro tunnels are usually omitted from lists of the country's tunnels.)

The 11 busiest stations (by number of boardings on a winter weekday in 2019) are:

References 

 
Rail transport in Stockholm
Railway lines opened in 1975
1975 establishments in Sweden